Navtej Singh Cheema is an Indian politician and belongs to Indian National Congress. He was member of Punjab Legislative Assembly and represented Sultanpur Lodhi.

Family
His father's name is Gurmail Singh Cheema (Former minister punjab), His wife's name is Jaspal kaur cheema, His son's name is Jaskaran Singh Cheema and Gurnihal Singh Cheema .

Political career
Cheema was elected to Punjab Legislative Assembly from Sultanpur Lodhi in 2012 by beating Punjab Education Minister Upinderjit Kaur.  Earlier in 2007, he had contested elections from Sultanpur Lodhi but lost to Upinderjit Kaur.

On 9 October 2015, Cheema along with party supporters blocked the Sultanpur Lodhi-Kapurthala road in protest at the filing of charges against Municipal Council president Vinod Kumar Gupta outside the Tehsil complex at Sultanpur Lodhi.

References

Living people
Indian Sikhs
Punjab, India MLAs 2012–2017
Year of birth missing (living people)
Place of birth missing (living people)
People from Kapurthala district
Indian National Congress politicians from Punjab, India
Punjab, India MLAs 2017–2022